Tohid Gholami (December 22, 1991) is an Iranian football midfielder, who currently plays for Sepidrood Rasht S.C. in Iran's Premier League football.

Club career
He played for Esteghlal in 2010–11 season.

Club career statistics

References

Honours

Club
Iran's Premier Football League
Runner up: 1
2010–11 with Esteghlal
Hazfi Cup
Winner: 1
2011–12 with Esteghlal
Hazfi Cup
Winner: 1
2016–17 with Naft Tehran

External links
 Tohid Gholami at Persian League
 

Iranian footballers
Living people
Esteghlal F.C. players
1991 births
Association football midfielders